Wolfgang Johannes Puck (born July 8, 1949) is an Austrian-American chef and restaurateur.

Early life and career

Puck was born in Sankt Veit an der Glan, Austria. He learned cooking from his mother, who was a pastry chef. He took the surname of his stepfather, Josef Puck, after his mother's remarriage. The marriage produced two younger sisters and a younger brother for Wolfgang. He trained as an apprentice under Raymond Thuilier at L'Oustau de Baumanière in Les Baux-de-Provence, at Hôtel de Paris in Monaco, and at Maxim's Paris before moving to the United States in 1973 at age 24. After two years at La Tour in Indianapolis, Puck moved to Los Angeles to become chef and part owner of Ma Maison restaurant.

Following the 1981 publication of his first cookbook, Modern French Cooking for the American Kitchen, which was based on his Ma Maison recipes, Puck opened the restaurant Spago on the Sunset Strip in 1982. Fifteen years later, in 1997, Puck and Barbara Lazaroff, his ex-wife and business partner, moved the award-winning Spago to Beverly Hills. It has been recognized as one of the Top 40 Restaurants in the U.S. since 2004. The Infatuation wrote that "Spago made Wolfgang Puck the first (and maybe only) chef you and your grandma know by name."

In 1991, Puck opened his fourth restaurant, Granita, a seafood restaurant in Malibu, California. The restaurant closed in 2005.

Since 2003, Puck's recipes have been syndicated worldwide to newspapers and websites by Tribune Content Agency.

Wolfgang Puck is active in philanthropic endeavors and charitable organizations. He co-founded the Puck-Lazaroff Charitable Foundation in 1982. The foundation supports the annual American Wine & Food Festival which benefits Meals on Wheels; it has raised more than $15 million since its inception.

One of Wolfgang Puck's signature dishes at his original restaurant, Spago, is house-smoked salmon pizza.

Personal life
He married Barbara Lazaroff in 1983, with whom he has two sons, Cameron and Byron. They were divorced in 2003. Barbara Lazaroff co-founded the Wolfgang Puck restaurants and continues to play a key role in the business. She has been instrumental in their interior design.

Puck became a U.S. citizen in 1999.

His favorite food is macarons.

Awards and honors
In 1985, Puck received a Golden Plate Award of the American Academy of Achievement in a ceremony at Denver, Colorado, presented by Awards Council member Ray Charles.

In 1993, Spago Hollywood was inducted into the Nation's Restaurant News Fine Dining Hall of Fame. The next year it received the James Beard Restaurant of the Year Award. In 2002, Puck received the 2001–2002 Daytime Emmy Award for Outstanding Service Show, Wolfgang Puck.

Spago Beverly Hills received a James Beard Foundation Outstanding Service Award in 2005. It was awarded two Michelin stars in the 2008 and 2009 Los Angeles Michelin Guide.

CUT Beverly Hills was awarded a Michelin star in 2007. In 2013, Puck was inducted into the Culinary Hall of Fame. In July 2016, CUT at the Marina Bay Sands, Singapore was awarded a Michelin Star.

On April 26, 2017, Puck received a star on the Hollywood Walk of Fame, for his work in the TV industry, located at 6801 Hollywood Boulevard.

On May 20, 2017, Puck was named the International Foodservice Manufacturers Association (IFMA) 2017 Gold Plate Winner.

In June 2022, Puck was recognized by the International Hospitality Institute on the Global 100 in Hospitality, as one of the 100 Most Powerful People in Global Hospitality.

Restaurants

Spago, Puck's first restaurant opened on the Sunset Strip (1982) serving California cuisine but later relocated to Beverly Hills.
Spago Istanbul by Wolfgang Puck at St. Regis Istanbul.
Spago, Marina Bay Sands hotel, Singapore
CUT in London, Beverly Hills, Las Vegas 
CUT by Wolfgang Puck at Four Seasons Hotels Bahrain Bay
CUT by Wolfgang Puck at The Shoppes at Marina Bay, Singapore
Five-Sixty was located in Dallas and featured Asian-inspired New American cuisine. After 11 years, it closed in April 2020,  due to the COVID-19 pandemic.
The Source, Washington, DC, modern interpretation of Asian cuisine located at the Newseum.
Wolfgang Puck Steak, a signature restaurant of MGM Grand Detroit in Detroit.

Bibliography

Modern French Cooking for the American Kitchen (1980)
The Wolfgang Puck Cookbook (1986)
Adventures in the Kitchen with Wolfgang Puck (1991)
Pizza, Pasta, and More (2000)
Live, Love, Eat (2002)
Wolfgang Puck Makes it Easy (2004)

Television and movie credits

Companies
Wolfgang Puck restaurants, catering services, cookbooks and licensed products are handled by Wolfgang Puck Companies, with three divisions: Wolfgang Puck Fine Dining Group, Wolfgang Puck Catering, and Wolfgang Puck Worldwide, Inc.

See also 
 List of American restaurateurs

References

External links

 
 

American male chefs
American restaurateurs
1949 births
Living people
American chief executives of food industry companies
American cookbook writers
American food company founders
American television chefs
Food Network chefs
Head chefs of Michelin starred restaurants
Businesspeople from Los Angeles
Writers from Los Angeles
Austrian emigrants to the United States
Austrian chefs
Austrian male writers
20th-century American male writers
21st-century American male writers
20th-century American businesspeople
21st-century American businesspeople
20th-century American non-fiction writers
21st-century American non-fiction writers
James Beard Foundation Award winners
American male non-fiction writers
People from Sankt Veit an der Glan
Chefs from Los Angeles